The Raid on Ruse was the first naval action to take place on the Romanian front during World War I. It took place on the first day of the campaign, 27 August 1916, just as Romanian troops were crossing the border into Transylvania, then part of Austria-Hungary.

The Romanian attack
During the night of 27 August 1916 three Romanian small torpedo boats (the old 10-ton Rândunica and the converted hydraulic service vessels Bujorescu and Catinca, each armed with two torpedoes in wooden carriages) attacked the Austro-Hungarian Navy's Danube Flotilla stationed in the Bulgarian port of Ruse, which consisted of five monitors and four armed river boats. The objective was to sink one of the monitors, but the attack failed in its immediate purpose, as only one barge loaded with fuel was sunk (by Rândunica, commanded by Captain Constantin Niculescu-Rizea) and a quay was damaged by another torpedo. The three crewmen of Rândunica were received as heroes in Bucharest, and the retreating Austro-Hungarian warships were prevented from interfering in the subsequent Battle of Turtucaia.

References 

Naval battles involving Romania
Naval battles of World War I involving Austria-Hungary
Naval battles involving Bulgaria